Carlisle City Football Club is a football club based in Carlisle, Cumbria, England.

History
The club was formed in 1975 by two former Carlisle United players, George Walker and Ron Thompson "to give local lads somewhere to play". They joined the Northern Alliance, and were runners-up in 1976–77 and 1977–78, and again in 1979–80.

After finishing bottom of the league in 1986–87, Carlisle left the Northern Alliance to join the Northern Combination. However, at the end of the 1987–88 season the Combination merged into the Northern Alliance, with Carlisle rejoining to become founder members of the new Division One. In 1991–92 they were Division One champions, earning promotion to the Premier Division. The club were subsequently Premier Division runners-up in 1993–94, 1995–96, 2002–03, 2013–14 and 2014–15. After finishing third in 2015–16, they were promoted to Division One of the North West Counties League.

At the end of the 2018–19 season, the club were transferred to Division Two of the Northern League. The club won the title in the 2021–22 season, earning promotion to Division One.

Ground
In 2015 the club took over the lease of Gillford Park from Celtic Nation, allowing them to move up to the North West Counties League.

Honours
Northern League
Division Two champions 2021–22
Northern Alliance
Division One champions 1991–92

Records
Best FA Cup performance: First qualifying round, 1976–77, 1977–78, 1978–79, 1979–80
Best FA Vase performance: Third round, 1976–77
Record attendance: 708 v Carlisle United, 8 July 2017

See also
Carlisle City F.C. players

References

External links
Official website

Football clubs in Cumbria
Football clubs in England
Sport in Carlisle, Cumbria
1975 establishments in England
Association football clubs established in 1975
Northern Football Alliance
North West Counties Football League clubs
Northern Football League